The Girl from the Islands or Maibritt, the Girl from the Islands is a 1964 West German-Swedish comedy film directed by Bostjan Hladnik and starring Jane Axell, Gunnar Möller, and Karl Schönböck. It was part of an attempt by some German comedy films of the era to be slightly more risqué.

Production
It was shot on location in Yugoslavia. The film's sets were designed by the art director Heinrich Mager. It was shot using eastmancolor. The Swedish actress Jane Axell was handpicked for the starring role, but after appearing in another German film Venusberg the same year she made only a few further minor appearances.

Synopsis
A German businessmen is sent to Stockholm by his boss to secure an important contract, in the face of foreign competition. He discovers that the intended client has gone sailing round the Swedish islands and follows him. He becomes mixed up with a mysterious young woman named Maibritt, who eventually turns out to be the daughter of his intended client.

Cast

References

Bibliography

External links 
 

1964 films
1964 comedy films
German comedy films
Swedish comedy films
West German films
1960s German-language films
Films directed by Bostjan Hladnik
Films set in Stockholm
Films set in the Baltic Sea
Films set on islands
Gloria Film films
1960s German films
1960s Swedish films